The Thiel Mountains are an isolated, mainly snow-capped mountain range of the Transantarctic Mountains System, located in the Ellsworth Land region of Antarctica.

Major components include Ford Massif (2,810 m), Bermel Escarpment and a group of eastern peaks near Nolan Pillar. The mountains were observed and first positioned by the USARP Horlick Mountains Traverse Party, 1958–59. The mountains were surveyed by the USGS Thiel Mountains parties of 1960-61 and 1961–62.

The Thiel Mountains were named by US-ACAN after Dr. Edward C. Thiel, traverse seismologist at Ellsworth Station and the Pensacola Mountains in 1957. In December 1959, he made airlifted geophysical observations along the 88th meridian west, including work near these mountains. Thiel perished with four others on November 9, 1961, in the crash of a P2V Neptune aircraft soon after take-off from Wilkes Station.

An aircraft fuel cache is located near the Thiel Mountains for planes traveling between the Union Glacier Camp and the Amundsen–Scott South Pole Station.

Gallery

See also
 Hercules Dome
 Streitenberger Cliff
 List of airports in Antarctica

References

Mountain ranges of Ellsworth Land
Transantarctic Mountains